National Secondary Route 103, or just Route 103 (or ) is a National Road Route of Costa Rica, located in the Heredia province.

Description
In Heredia province the route covers Heredia canton (Ulloa district), Santo Domingo canton (Santo Domingo, Santa Rosa districts).

References

Highways in Costa Rica